The Heart of Dixie Railroad Museum (initialised HOD, reporting mark CSMX) is the official state railroad museum of Alabama.

The museum features a wide range of locomotives, cars and other railroad equipment that dates from the 19th century to the 1950s and operates regularly scheduled excursions with museum equipment over the museum's track. It also features two depots that are approximately 100 years old.

Overview 
The museum operates a heritage railroad that offers two excursion trains every Saturday from March to December. It also operates excursions on special dates such as Halloween and Christmas. The standard gauge train operates with a diesel locomotive on a  section of the former Alabama Mineral Railroad, a division of the Louisville and Nashville Railroad. The museum offers visitors the opportunity to ride in the cab of the locomotive and in a caboose in addition to the enclosed and open-air passenger cars.

This train served the nearby Birmingham Zoo for many years before being placed into operation at the museum.

Locomotives
The museum maintains three operating first generation diesel-electric locomotives for powering excursion trains and shop switching. Six additional diesel-electric locomotives are presented as static displays as well as two electric shop locomotives. Builders represented include GM Electro-Motive Division, Whitcomb, Baldwin, Alco, and Fairbanks-Morse.

Though none are in service, the museum also has four steam locomotives on display. While lacking much of its original operating equipment and gauges, the cab of the 1924 Woodward Iron Baldwin 2-8-0 locomotive is open to the public and is equipped with wooden stairs for visitors. Two other steam locomotives have also been cosmetically restored for display, including a unique 1953 fireless steam powered switching locomotive operated by Alabama Power Company which did not have a firebox, but instead received steam from the plant's boilers and used that stored steam to operate for about four hours a charge. Builders displayed include Baldwin, Alco, Lima, and Davenport.

Rolling stock
The museum displays over forty pieces of rolling stock, spanning the early-to-late 20th century including passenger, railway post office, and freight cars. Numerous passenger cars have been restored and are now used on the museum's excursions. Birthday parties are hosted in a restored dining car adjacent to the visitors center. Many of the freight and passenger cars are awaiting restoration from damage previously incurred while stored in an unsecured location

Specialty equipment

Among the museum's collection are two heavy-duty rail mounted cranes used in construction and wreck-clearing duty. Additionally, the museum has several railcars that once belonged to the United States Air Force Strategic Air Command which were to be used as part of the Peacekeeper Intercontinental Ballistic Missile program which planned the rail-based deployment of such missiles.

Stations
The museum includes two former community railway stations in its collection. The former Wilton, Alabama depot, now signed for Calera, houses many railroad artifact displays and serves as the station for excursion trains. The former Woodlawn, Alabama depot houses the Boone Library of railroad books, slides, photographs and other research materials.

Signals
A signal garden continues to be developed between the Calera depot and the main museum visitor center which features working crossing signals, a semaphore, and other railroad signals.

Interior displays
The Calera depot houses a collection of railroad artifact displays focusing on the history of railroads in Alabama. Exhibits include railway lanterns, locomotive headlights, rail cross sections, and passenger train china and silver ware. The Boone Library in the Woodlawn depot and adjacent railcar contains print and other media as well as an extensive collection of old maps, track diagrams, timetables, technical manuals, etc. for public research use.

History

The Heart of Dixie Railroad Museum, Inc. began as the Heart of Dixie Railroad Club. Its first location was at 18th Street South and 1st Avenue South in downtown Birmingham, across from the Alabama Power Steam Generation Plant. The cars were largely donated to the club by their respective railroads. However, the cars were vulnerable to vandals. Several cars were burned in different disputes over territory by homeless people. In the early 1980s, the Club moved to Calera and secured several hundred acres of land between 17th Avenue and 20th Avenue along 9th Street.
The Calera & Shelby Railroad (the  trains) runs along a  section of the former L&N Mineral loop, constructed in 1891 to collect the minerals necessary for making iron, then looping back to Birmingham to drop off the minerals at the local ironworks. The line was abandoned when Alabama Power dammed up the Coosa River for a new hydroelectric plant. This would have flooded the bridge over the Coosa River, which was subsequently removed. CSX later pulled up the rails along the line.  of right-of-way were purchased by the Heart of Dixie Railroad Club (now Heart of Dixie Railroad Museum, Inc.) when they moved to Calera in the 1980s. Since then, the museum has been replacing the track along the right-of-way. The track currently ends at Springs Junction, Alabama, just east of its crossing of Shelby County Highway 86.
The Shelby & Southern Railroad (the  narrow gauge train) rolling stock is the former park train of the Birmingham Zoo. Some  gauge track was purchased, a station and maintenance shed were built, the cars were sandblasted, re-lettered, and re-painted, and the propane-fired, Crown Metal Products 4-4-0 steam engine was sent to the Tweetsie Railroad for refurbishment. The S&S opened in 2002 during "Day out with Thomas", a two-weekend period where Thomas the Tank Engine comes to visit the museum between March and April.

See also

Birmingham District
List of United States railroads
List of Alabama railroads
List of heritage railroads in the United States
List of railway museums

References

External links

Alabama railroads
Heritage railroads in Alabama
Historic American Buildings Survey in Alabama
Historic American Engineering Record in Alabama
Museums in Shelby County, Alabama
Railroad museums in Alabama